John Donald McPherson (February 20, 1945 – November 24, 2001) was a Canadian figure skater. He is the 1963 World Champion and the 1963 Canadian national champion. He represented Canada at the 1960 Winter Olympics, where he placed 10th at the age of 15. He turned 15 years old during the Olympic figure skating competition.

Donald McPherson started to skate with the age of 4. He represented the Stratford Figure Skating Club in Ontario, and was coached by Dennis Silverthorne.  He won the 1963 World Figure Skating Championships at the age of 18, becoming the youngest men's World Champion.  McPherson won his World title skating on an unusual pair of skates with small serrations in the blades.

Following that win, he turned professional, starring in Dick Button's Ice-Travanganza at the 1964 New York World's Fair.  He also toured for 11 years for Holiday on Ice, and won the 1965 World Professional Figure Skating Championships.

He was inducted into the Canadian Sports Hall of Fame in 1963 and the Canadian Figure Skating Hall of Fame in 1996.

Donald McPherson was inducted into the Stratford Sports Hall of Fame in the Athlete's Section on Saturday April 16, 2011 along with Howie Morenz, Larry Landreth and Jodeyne Higgins' Also inducted were the 1977 JS News Peewees Baseball team and the 1952 Stratford Indians Senior Men's Hockey team in the Team Category. Denis 'Dinny' Flanagan was inducted in the builder's category.

Later in life, he moved to Munich, Germany. He died of complications arising from diabetes in Munich on November 24, 2001.

Competitive highlights

 J = Junior level

References

External links

 http://www.abendblatt.de/extra/service/944949.html?url=/ha/2001/xml/20011201xml/habxml011012_18055.xml
 
 

1945 births
2001 deaths
Canadian male single skaters
Deaths from diabetes
Figure skaters at the 1960 Winter Olympics
Olympic figure skaters of Canada
Skating people from Ontario
Sportspeople from Windsor, Ontario
World Figure Skating Championships medalists